The Battle of Fontenoy was a major engagement of the War of the Austrian Succession, fought on 11 May 1745 near Tournai in modern Belgium. A French army of 50,000 under Marshal Saxe defeated a Pragmatic Army  of roughly the same size, led by the Duke of Cumberland. 

At the beginning of 1745, the French were struggling to finance the war but held the initiative in the Austrian Netherlands, which offered the best opportunity for a decisive victory. In late April 1745, Saxe besieged Tournai, whose position on the upper Scheldt made it a vital link in the North European trading network, and thus meant the Allies would have to fight for it.

After a number of unsuccessful flank assaults, the Allies made a frontal attack on the French centre with an infantry column of 15,000 men, before French cavalry charges and counterattacks inflicted heavy casualties, and forced them to withdraw toward Brussels. Tournai fell shortly afterwards, then Ghent, Oudenarde, Bruges, and Dendermonde, followed by Ostend and Nieuwpoort when British troops were withdrawn in October to deal with the Jacobite rising of 1745. This left France in control of much of the Austrian Netherlands, cementing Saxe's reputation as one of the most talented generals of the era and restoring French battlefield superiority in Europe. 

However, by December 1745, Louis XV's Finance Minister warned him France faced bankruptcy, leading to peace talks in May 1746 at the Congress of Breda. Despite victories at Rocoux in 1746, Lauffeld in 1747, and Maastricht in 1748, the cost of the war and the British naval blockade meant the French economic position continued to deteriorate. As a result, their gains in the Austrian Netherlands were returned after the Treaty of Aix-la-Chapelle in November 1748.

Background

The immediate cause of the War of the Austrian Succession was the death in 1740 of Emperor Charles VI, the last male Habsburg in the direct line. Since the Habsburg monarchy was governed by Salic law, Maria Theresa, his eldest daughter and heir, was technically excluded from the throne, a condition waived by the Pragmatic Sanction of 1713.

The closest male heir was Charles of Bavaria, who challenged the legality of Maria Theresa's succession. A family inheritance dispute became a European issue because the Monarchy dominated the Holy Roman Empire, a federation of mostly German states, headed by the Holy Roman Emperor. Technically an elected position, in January 1742 Charles became the first non-Habsburg Emperor in 300 years, supported by France, Prussia and Saxony. Maria Theresa was backed by the so-called Pragmatic Allies; Austria, Britain, Hanover, and the Dutch Republic.

After four years of conflict, the main beneficiary was Prussia, which captured the Austrian province of Silesia during the First Silesian War (1740-1742). The richest province in the Empire, Silesian taxes provided 10% of total Imperial income and contained large mining, weaving and dyeing industries. Regaining it was a priority for Maria Theresa and led to the 1744–1745 Second Silesian War. Shortly after Charles died in January 1745, the Austrians over-ran Bavaria and on 15 April, defeated a Franco-Bavarian force at Pfaffenhofen. Charles' son, Maximilian III Joseph, now sued for peace and supported the election of Maria Theresa's husband, Francis Stephen, as the new Emperor. With Bavaria out of the war, Austria could focus on Silesia, while France was released from its involvement in Germany, and could concentrate on Italy and the Low Countries.

The 1745 campaign in the Austrian Netherlands

In the first half of 1744 France made significant advances in the Austrian Netherlands, before being forced to divert resources to meet threats elsewhere. For the 1745 campaign, Maurice de Saxe persuaded Louis XV it was the best place to inflict a decisive defeat on Britain, whose military and financial resources were central to the Allied war effort. His plan was to bring the Pragmatic Allies to battle on a ground of his choosing, before British financial strength could be used to fund extra troops and establish local superiority. France also held several advantages over its opponents, including a highly competent commander in Saxe, larger numbers of available troops and a unified command, unlike the Allies who were often deeply divided over strategy and objectives. 

Most of the fighting took place in what is often referred to as Flanders, a compact area 160 kilometres wide, its highest point only 100 metres above sea level and dominated by rivers running southwest to northeast. Until the advent of railways in the 19th century, bulk goods and supplies were transported by water, and wars in this region were fought for control of major waterways, including the rivers Lys, Sambre and Meuse. 

The most important of these was the Scheldt (see Map), which began in Northern France and ran for  before entering the North Sea at Antwerp. Saxe planned to attack Tournai, a town close to the French border which controlled access to the upper Scheldt basin, making it a vital link in the trading network for Northern Europe. With a garrison of over 8,000, it was also the strongest of the Dutch Barrier Forts in the Austrian Netherlands, factors which Saxe anticipated would force the Allies to fight for it.  

In March 1745, George Wade was replaced as Allied commander in Flanders by the 24-year-old Duke of Cumberland, advised by the experienced Earl Ligonier. In addition to British and Hanoverian troops, the Pragmatic Army included a large Dutch contingent, commanded by Prince Waldeck, with a small number of Austrians, led by Count Königsegg. However, a coherent Allied strategy was undermined by internal disputes and different  objectives; the British and Hanoverians resented and mistrusted each other, Austria did not consider Flanders a military priority and Waldeck was unpopular with his subordinates, who often disputed his orders. These divisions were exacerbated by Cumberland's inexperience, lack of diplomatic skill and tendency to ignore advice.

On 21 April, a French cavalry detachment under d'Estrées feinted towards Mons and Cumberland prepared to march to its relief. Although it soon became clear this was a diversion, French intentions remained unclear until the siege of Tournai began on 28 April. This uncertainty, combined with intelligence estimates that Saxe had only 30,000 men, meant the Allies advanced on Tournai with only their field army of 50,000, leaving large garrisons at nearby Namur and Charleroi. Having confirmed the Allies were approaching from the south-east, on 7 May Saxe left 22,000 men to continue the siege and placed his main force of 50,000  around the villages of Fontenoy and Antoing, 8 kilometres (5.0 mi) from Tournai.

Battle

As Saxe considered his infantry inferior in training and discipline to their opponents, where possible he placed them behind defensive works or redoubts and fortified the villages. The French positions ran along the crest of a plateau, with the right resting on the Scheldt, the left stationed behind the Bois de Barry, with the Redoubt d'Eu and Redoubt de Chambonas covering the gap between the wood and his centre, which was based in Fontenoy. The Chemin de Mons sloped down from Fontenoy to the small hamlets of Vezon and Bourgeon below (see Battle Map), exposing any direct attack on the village to prolonged fire from in front and the flanks.  

The Allies came into contact with the French outposts on the evening of 9 May, but a hasty reconnaissance by Cumberland and his staff failed to spot the Redoubt d'Eu. On 10 May, British and Hanoverian cavalry under James Campbell pushed the French out of Vezon and Bourgeon. Campbell's deputy, the Earl of Crawford, then recommended that infantry be sent to clear the Bois de Barry, while the cavalry swung around it to outflank the French left. Unfortunately, this plan was abandoned when Dutch hussars reconnoitring the route were fired on by French troops in the wood and withdrew. 

The attack was postponed until the following day, both armies camping overnight on their positions. At 4:00 am on 11 May, the Allies formed up, British and Hanoverians on the right and centre, Dutch on the left, with the Austrians in reserve. The Dutch were ordered to take Fontenoy and Antoing, while a brigade under Richard Ingoldsby captured the Redoubt de Chambonas, and cleared the Bois de Barry. Once both flanks were engaged, massed Allied infantry in the centre under Ligonier would advance up the slope, and dislodge the main French army. 

As soon as it was light, the Allied artillery opened fire on the defences around Fontenoy, but the bombardment had little effect on the dug-in French infantry. Because Cumberland had badly under-estimated French numbers, he assumed their main force was in the centre and failed to appreciate the strength of the flanking positions. Almost immediately Ingoldsby ran into the Redoubt d'Eu and only then did the real strength of the French left become apparent. He requested artillery support, and the advance halted while his men skirmished in the woods with light troops known as Harquebusiers de Grassins. These numbered no more than 900 but uncertain of their strength, Ingoldsby hesitated; given the earlier failure to detect the redoubt, his caution was understandable but delayed the main attack. 

Growing impatient, at 7:00 am Cumberland ordered Ingoldsby to abandon his assault on the Redoubt d'Eu and join the main column, although he failed to inform Ligonier. As the Dutch infantry advanced on Fontenoy supported by their cavalry, they were fired on by French troops in the nearby walled cemetery and fell back with heavy losses. At 9:00 am, Ligonier sent an aide instructing Ingoldsby to attack the Redoubt d'Eu immediately and was apparently horrified when Ingoldsby shared his change of orders. At 10:30, the Dutch assaulted Fontenoy again, supported by the 42nd Foot; after some initial success, they were forced to retreat, and at 12:30 pm Cumberland ordered the central column forward.

Generally thought to comprise some 15,000 infantry, the column advanced up the slope led by Cumberland and Ligonier, and despite heavy casualties reached the crest still in formation. They halted in front of the French position to dress their lines and having done so, the Guards in the first rank allegedly invited the Gardes Françaises to open fire. First reported by Voltaire in 1768, there is some doubt as to the reliability of this anecdote, but the opening volley was considered so important that commanders often preferred their opponents to go first, particularly if their own troops were well disciplined and thus able to absorb it without losing cohesion.

Thus goaded, the Gardes fired prematurely, greatly reducing the impact of their first volley, while that of the British killed or wounded 700 to 800 men. The French front line broke up in confusion; many of their reserves had been transferred to meet the Dutch attack on Fontenoy, and the Allies now advanced into this gap. Seeing this, Noailles, who was observing the fighting from a position near Notre Dame de Bois along with Louis XV and his son, implored the king to seek safety. However, Saxe assured Louis the battle was not lost, while Löwendal ordered a series of cavalry attacks, which succeeded in forcing the Allies back. Isolated in the middle of the column, Cumberland had lost control of the main battle and made no attempt to relieve pressure on the Allied centre by ordering fresh attacks on Fontenoy or the Redoubt d'Eu. Under fire from both flanks and in front, the column formed itself into a hollow, three sided square, reducing their firepower advantage. 

 

Although poorly co-ordinated, their cavalry charges had allowed the French infantry to reform and at 14:00 Saxe brought up his remaining artillery, which began firing into the Allied square at close range. This was followed by a general assault, with the regiments d'Aubeterre, du Roi, Royal and de la Couronne attacking from the right, the Irish Brigade, regiments des Vaisseaux, Normandie, d'Eu and two battalions of the Gardes françaises the left. The assault cost the Aubeterre regiment 328 wounded or killed, while the four battalions of the Régiment Royal lost a total of 675, including 30 officers, and the Irish Brigade 656, including 25% of their officers. 

Led by Saxe and Löwendal, the Gardes Françaises attacked once more, while D'Estrées and Richelieu brought up the elite Maison du roi cavalry, forcing the column back with heavy losses. The Hanoverian Böselager regiment suffered 377 casualties, the largest of any single Allied unit, the 23rd Foot 322 and the three Guards regiments over 700 in total. Despite this, discipline and training allowed the Allied infantry to make an orderly withdrawal, with the rearguard halting at intervals to fire on their pursuers. Once they reached Vezon, the cavalry provided cover as they moved into columns of march, before retreating  to Ath, largely undisturbed by the French. This decision was opposed by Waldeck and other Dutch officers, who were reluctant to abandon their garrison in Tournai; one of them later wrote that "We were repulsed without being [defeated but...] our hasty retreat makes us look beaten...[while] we have left a lot of the baggage and many wounded".

Aftermath

Fontenoy was the bloodiest battle in Western Europe since Malplaquet in 1709, with French losses around 7,000 or 8,000 killed and wounded, those of the Allies somewhere between 8,000  to 12,000, including prisoners. Victory restored French battlefield pre-eminence in Europe,  although the best of the Allied infantry remained superior to their opponents. Since his presence technically made him senior commander, Louis became the first French king able to claim a battlefield victory over the English since Louis IX. His leadership role was emphasised in a propaganda campaign to bolster his personal prestige, which included a laudatory poem by Voltaire, titled La Bataille De Fontenoy.  

It also cemented Saxe's reputation as one of the leading generals of the period, although his domestic opponents attacked him for not pursuing with more vigour. In response, he pointed out his troops were exhausted while the Allied cavalry and large parts of their infantry remained intact and fresh. These critics did not include either Louis XV or Frederick the Great, who viewed Fontenoy as a tactical masterpiece and invited Saxe to Sanssouci to discuss it. His victory was also achieved despite being in great pain from edema or 'dropsy', and forced to exercise command from a wicker chair carried round the battlefield.

On the other hand, Cumberland performed poorly as a commander, ignoring advice from his more experienced subordinates, failing to ensure the Bois de Barry was properly cleared and issuing Ingoldsby with conflicting orders. Although praised for his courage, the inactivity of the Allied cavalry was partly due to his participation in the infantry attack, and loss of strategic oversight. Ligonier and others viewed Fontenoy as a 'defeat snatched from the jaws of victory' and although understandable for a 24 year old in his first major engagement, the same faults were apparent at the Battle of Lauffeld in 1747.

In the recriminations that followed, Ingoldsby was Court martialled for the delay in attacking the Redoubt d'Eu, although his claim to have received inconsistent orders was clearly supported by the evidence. He himself was wounded, while the largest casualties of any units involved were incurred by two regiments from his brigade, the 12th Foot and Böselager's. The court concluded his actions arose 'from an error of judgement, not want of courage', but he was forced out of the army, a decision many considered unjust. Cumberland and some of his staff also blamed the Dutch for not relieving pressure on the centre by continuing their attack on Fontenoy. This view was supported by Dutch cavalry commander Casimir van Schlippenbach, who criticised his infantry for refusing to advance. However, most accounts suggest this failure was due to the confusion caused by Cumberland himself, while the Dutch infantry maintained formation and retreated in good order.

Regardless, Waldeck was critical of the lack of initiative displayed by his troops, as was Isaac Cronström, head of the Dutch infantry. Born in 1661, the latter fought at Malplaquet, where the Dutch had continued to attack French entrenchments despite incurring very heavy casualties. In a letter to Grand Pensionary Anthonie van der Heim, he noted "these troops are [not] like those in the previous war", while in his official report to the States General, Waldeck claimed "the famous old Dutch courage" had gone. These conclusions led the two men to implement an intensive programme of retraining, and the Dutch performed significantly better at Rocoux in 1746. However, in general the war confirmed the decline of the Dutch military and the loss of their Great Power status; the Duke of Newcastle, who as Secretary of State oversaw British foreign policy, later berated himself for his "ignorance, obstinacy, and credulity", in believing otherwise.   

With no hope of relief, Tournai surrendered on 20 June, followed by the loss of Ostend and Nieuport; in October, the British were forced to divert resources to deal with the Jacobite rising of 1745, allowing Saxe to continue his advance in 1746. Despite the presence of Dutch troops in the Pragmatic Army, France did not declare war on the Dutch Republic itself until 1747, a decision which made their immediate financial situation even worse, since carrying their goods in "neutral" Dutch ships had been the main way for French merchants to evade the British naval blockade. By the end of 1747, France had occupied most of the Austrian Netherlands and was on the verge of advancing into Dutch territory, but their economy was being strangled by the blockade, which was also causing widespread food shortages. Peace was a matter of extreme urgency and despite the huge military and financial costs involved, under the 1748 Treaty of Aix-la-Chapelle Louis XV agreed to evacuate the Austrian Netherlands for minimal return, leading to a popular French phrase "as stupid as the Peace".

Legacy

The participation of the Irish Brigade and the casualties incurred led 19th and early 20th century Irish nationalists to portray Fontenoy as the "pinnacle of Irish military valour", with the battle giving its name to a variety of streets, buildings and athletic clubs. In 1905, Nationalist author Richard Barry O'Brien founded a committee to fund an Irish Brigade memorial in the village of Fontenoy, where it still features in annual commemorations of the battle.

When surveying the battlefield, Louis XV reportedly said: ‘See how much blood a triumph costs. The blood of our enemies is still the blood of men. The true glory is to save it.’ In 1968, the French army installed a memorial in the neighbouring town of Vezon which bears this quotation.

In Northern Ireland, in the village of  Leitrim, County down, the local  Gaelic club is named ‘Liatroim Fontenoys’ in reference to the battle.

Notes

References

Sources
 
 
 
 
 
 
 
 
 
 
 
 
 
 
 
 
 
 
 
 
 
 
 
 
 
 
 
 
 
 
 
 *

Bibliography
 
 

Battles involving France
Battles involving Great Britain
Battles involving Hanover
Battles involving the Dutch Republic
Battles involving Austria
Battles of the War of the Austrian Succession
Conflicts in 1745
1745 in France
1745 in Great Britain
1745 in the Dutch Republic
1745 in Austria
Flight of the Wild Geese
Battles in Wallonia
Battle